Lemmy pour les dames is a 1962 French eurospy film directed by Bernard Borderie.

Synopsis 
Lemmy Caution is on holidays. While he seeks recreation he happens to get entangled in a murder investigation. Soon it is revealed that the female victim had been blackmailed by a foreign secret service. Her husband works for the government and is in possession of national secrets. Her friends are likewise blackmailed and forced into spying on their husbands. Lemmy takes care of this matter.

Cast 
 Eddie Constantine as Lemmy Caution
 Françoise Brion as Marie-Christine 
 Claudine Coster as Françoise 
 Éliane d'Almeida as Sophie 
 Yvonne Monlaur as Claudia
 Jacques Berthier as Doctor Nollet 
 Robert Berri as Dombie 
 Guy Delorme as Mirko 
 Lionel Roc as Hugo 
 Paul Mercey as Inspector Boumègue 
 Jacques Hilling as the hotel keeper
 Carita as Perraque

Background
Henri Cogan was the instructor and choreographer for all fighting scenes.

Reception
"The Eurospy Guide" evaluates the film as "a pleasant diversion" which is fit to make modern audiences understand why Eddie Constantine enjoyed such popularity back then.

Bibliography

References

External links 
 
 
 Lemmy pour les dames at the DBCult Film Institute
 French Gallery for Lemmy pour les dames

1962 films
French spy films
Films directed by Bernard Borderie
Films based on British novels
1960s French films